The Castiglioni College can be considered the oldest university college in Pavia. It was founded by Cardinal Branda da Castiglione in 1429.

History 

In 1429 Cardinal Branda da Castiglione, who had studied at the University of Pavia, decided to found a college in the city that was to host, initially, 24 poor but deserving students, 18 Italians and six foreigners. The same cardinal also wrote the first statutes of the college, which were approved by Pope Martin V. Furthermore, Branda da Castiglione also managed to obtain privileges from both the pope and the emperor Sigismund, including exemption from taxes for the college both for his students. The cardinal, in addition to the goods essential to his existence, endowed his foundation with a refectory, a garden, a rich library and a chapel and also donated vast agricultural properties in the Pavia countryside to the college.
In many centuries of history the College went through various periods of difficulty. For example, in the sixteenth century, during the first phase of the war between Charles V and Francis I, which heavily involved Pavia, where the famous battle of Pavia also took place, the College had to host Spanish and German students and was even closed for some time.
In 1533, however, the College was open and in 1535 it housed sixteen students.
In the second half of the 16th century, Cardinal Francesco Abbondio Castiglioni took care of the college, rearranging its economic situation and bringing the number of students to over twenty in 1570.
In 1640 the statutes of the college were modified, but the institution began to go through a phase of decline, so much so that in 1770, the plenipotentiary minister of Austrian Lombardy, Karl Joseph von Firmian, decided to merge it with other colleges of Pavia and to reform it.
In 1804 the college was joined to the nearby Ghislieri college and in 1805 it was sold to the chemist Luigi Valentino Brugnatelli, who transformed it into the home of the Brugnatelli family. In 1928, Luigi Brugnatelli, professor of Mineralogy at the University of Pavia and grandson of Luigi Valentino Brugnatelli, donated the building to the University of Pavia, which, after careful restoration, reopened it in 1948 and transformed it into the College Castiglioni Brugnatelli.

Architecture 
The current building is the result of several progressive interventions that altered, in part, the original construction, documenting the long history of the building, its changes of ownership and intended uses.
The ancient and monumental structure is spread over three floors above ground with staggered levels and has brick masonry left exposed. The building has a U-shaped plan which defines a large rectangular courtyard inside.
Remarkable in this building remains the oratory, which has paintings of great interest dating back to 1475, and the work of Bonifacio Bembo, who was housed in the college that year and who also worked at the Visconti Castle in Pavia. The oratory consists of a square room covered by rib vaults inside which, within wreaths of flowers and fruit, there are four medallions with the symbols of the Evangelists, while the creases are flanked by festoons that stand out against the dark red background ; on the walls are depicted the Resurrection (north wall), the Nativity and the Adoration of the Magi.

References 

Buildings and structures in Pavia
University of Pavia
Education in Lombardy
Gothic architecture in Lombardy